The 2012 J.League Division 2 season is the 41st season of the second-tier club football in Japan and the 14th season since the establishment of J2 League. The season started on March 4 and will finish on November 11, followed by the promotion playoffs among the 3rd to 6th placed clubs (see the article).

Ventforet Kofu became champions and returned to J1 immediately after one season at J2. Shonan Bellmare finished second and also won the automatic promotion along with Kofu, returning to the J1 after two years of absence. Oita Trinita finished sixth, but won the promotion playoffs by defeating 3rd-placed Kyoto Sanga at the semifinal and 5th-placed JEF United Chiba at the final thus returning to the J1 after three years of absence.

For the first time ever, relegation to the third-tier JFL was implemented, and Machida Zelvia became the unlucky first team to suffer that fate by finishing in bottom place only one season after entering the professional divisions.

Clubs

The expected participant clubs are as follows:

Promotions and relegations

Promotions to Division 1
Rather than 3 spots for automatic promotions to J.League Division 1 (J1) until the previous season, there are only 2 spots for automatic promotions from this season, and the 3rd promoting club will be determined by a play-off called Play-off for Promotion to J1 held by 4 clubs (3rd – 6th placed clubs in the standings in the league matches). The regulation is:
First Round
Two fixtures will be held, the "3rd placed club versus the 6th placed club" and the "4th placed club versus the 5th placed club". Each tie will be played as one-off match at the home stadium, which was determined by the standings in the league matches (i.e., 3rd and 4th placed clubs' stadiums).
Final Round
The fixture will be held between the two winners of the first-round fixtures. The tie will be played as one-off match at a neutral venue, which was determined to be the Tokyo National Stadium on 23 July.
Tiebreakers
If the score is tied after 90 minutes, neither extra time nor penalty shoot-out will be held, the winner is determined by the standings in the league matches.
Exceptional Cases
In case one or more clubs of 3rd–6th places cannot meet promotion criteria, remaining clubs will participate in the play-off: the spots cannot be replaced by 7th-placed or lower clubs' case only three of the four clubs meet the promotion criteria, the highest ranked club among them will receive a bye to the final round.
 In case only two of the four clubs meet the promotion criteria, only the final round will be held.
 In case only one of the four clubs meets the promotion criteria, it will automatically promote.
 In case none of the four clubs meets the promotion criteria, the number of promoting club will be decreased.

On 28 September, it was announced that the following clubs did not meet the criteria, mainly in regard to the stadium's size, which are required to J1 clubs to maintain, thus will not be promoted to J1, or participating promotion playoffs even if finishing in the appropriate standing at the end of the regular season:
Mito HollyHock
Thespa Kusatsu
Machida Zelvia
FC Gifu
Gainare Tottori
Ehime FC
Giravanz Kitakyushu
Oita Trinita was granted a J1 license allowing promotion, but this will be revoked if the club cannot pay back ¥300 million debt to the JFA by 12 October.

Relegations to JFL
In 2008, J.League and Japan Football Association planned that at most 3 clubs in J2 are to relegate to Japan Football League (JFL) every season after the number of J2 clubs reached 22.

In January 2012, since the number of J2 clubs reached 22 from this season, J.League determined the regulation of the relegations from J2 to JFL that at most 2 clubs in J2 will relegate to JFL every season. The regulation is:
1st placed JFL club will replace a J2 club if it meets promotion criteria.
2nd placed JFL club will replace a J2 club if it meets promotion criteria and wins a home-and-away play-off against the J2 club.
3rd placed or lower JFL clubs cannot promote to J2 even if 1st or 2nd placed JFL clubs do not meet promotion criteria: the number of relegating clubs from J2 will be decreased.
Thus, in the play-off, the second last (i.e. 21st placed) J2 club will meet the 2nd placed JFL club if 1st placed JFL club promotes to J2; otherwise the last (i.e. 22nd placed) J2 club will meet.

League table

Results

Top scorers

Updated to games played on 11 November 2012
Source: J. League

Attendances

Promotion Playoffs to Division 1
2012 J.League Road To J1 Play-Offs (2012 J1昇格プレーオフ)
The schedule was as follows. The format would be changed if one or more of the involved clubs could not meet the promotion criteria to Division 1.

If the score tied by 90 minutes, the winner would be determined by the league standings.

Semifinals

Final

Oita Trinita promoted to J.League Division 1.

References

J2 League seasons
2
Japan
Japan